A psychiatric casualty is a military combatant who is unable to continue fighting due to some sort of mental debilitation. The debilitations a casualty can experience are extensive; they can be anything from affective disorders to somatoform disorders, with many psychiatric casualties developing long term or permanent post-traumatic stress disorder. Treatment generally consists of simply removing a soldier from combat; however, psychotherapy is sometimes used.

See also 
 Casualty (person)
 Post-traumatic stress disorder

References 

Military psychiatry